The Gift is a 1979 made-for-television film directed by Don Taylor and starring Glenn Ford, Gary Frank and Julie Harris.

External links

1979 television films
1979 films
American television films